Little Buffalo is an Indian settlement and hamlet in northern Alberta, Canada within Northern Sunrise County. Little Buffalo Lake is to the south of the community.

History 
Land claims
"The Lubicon Lake Indian Band land claim has a history dating back one hundred years, when the Band was left out of the original Treaty Eight signing by government agents in 1889." On October 22, 1988, Lubicon Chief Bernard Ominayak and Alberta Provincial Premier Don Getty negotiated an agreement, since called the "Grimshaw Accord". through which the Province of Alberta transferred 79 square miles of land (with full surface and sub-surface rights) to the Government of Canada to establish a reserve for the Lubicon First Nation On 10 June 2013, on behalf of the Lubicon Cree, aboriginal rights lawyer, James O'Reilly sent letters to Shell Canada, PineCrest, Atco, Andora Energy Corp., Clean Harbours, Mancal Energy Inc. and Penn West Petroleum which operate in the disputed land claims area, warning that their resource projects will be "vigorously opposed" unless they have the consent of the First Nation.

2011 Little Buffalo oil spill

The spill was caused by a rupture in the Rainbow Pipeline system, owned by Plains Midstream Canada, a unit of Plains All American Pipeline. It was the largest oil spill in Alberta in 36 years. The local school was closed following the oil spill due to concerns about the effects of fumes. In 2013, Alberta's Energy Resource Conservation Board (ERCB) issued a reprimand to Plains Mainstream for operational failures in connection with the oil spill.

2013 pipeline spill
The size of the spill and the  area affected, which includes surface waters and muskeg lands, reported by Pennwest alarmed the Lubicon Lake Cree, who now claim the spill is larger than initial estimates. Bernard Ominayak, the chief of the Lubicon Lake Nation is concerned about the safety of the Lubicon Cree citizens and their environment, including groundwater and wildlife. Alberta Environment and Water was onsite by June 24 and is investigating the leak, which occurred during the period of heavy rain. The concurrent closure of Pennwest's office in downtown Calgary due to the 2013 Alberta floods has had a "negative effect on the management of the spill, particularly when it comes to communications."

Demographics 
Settlement

In the 2016 Census of Population conducted by Statistics Canada, Little Buffalo had a population of 452 living in 113 of its 130 total private dwellings, a  change from its 2011 population of 387.

Hamlet
The population of Little Buffalo according to the 2010 municipal census conducted by Northern Sunrise County is 225.

See also 
List of communities in Alberta
List of hamlets in Alberta

References

External links 
 The Great Sunrise Divide (Curtis Haugan. "Record-Gazette". August 26, 2008) 

Hamlets in Alberta
Northern Sunrise County